The Nandouya Mosque is a mosque in Dongcheng District, Beijing, China.

History
The mosque was originally constructed in 1879 during the Qing Dynasty. In 2003, the mosque was relocated to its current location which is around 100 meters from its original location due to the development of the city. The new mosque was constructed with a cost of CNY8 million, collected from the Beijing City Government and donation from local Muslims.

Architecture
The mosque has a capacity of 200 worshipers and spans over an area of 1,600 m2. It was built with orientation facing east and west with an Islamic lintel topped with a crescent moon on top of it. It also has a meeting room. The front of the mosque is a courtyard surrounded by corridors.

Transportation
The mosque is accessible within walking distance north of Chaoyangmen Station of Beijing Subway.

See also
 Islam in China
 List of mosques in China

References

1879 establishments in China
Buildings and structures in Dongcheng District, Beijing
Mosques completed in 1879
Mosques in Beijing